Brener Antunes das Chagas or simply Brener (born 27 November 1975 in Itaboraí) is a former Brazilian football player.

Honours
Vasco da Gama
Brasileirão champion: 1997
Campeonato Carioca champion: 1998
Copa Libertadores winner: 1998

See also

 Moshe Brener (born 1971), Israeli basketball player

References

1975 births
Sportspeople from Rio de Janeiro (state)
Living people
Brazilian footballers
CR Vasco da Gama players
Rio Branco Atlético Clube players
FC Elista players
Brazilian expatriate footballers
Expatriate footballers in Russia
Russian Premier League players
Treze Futebol Clube players
Associação Atlética Internacional (Limeira) players
Guarani FC players
Avaí FC players
União Agrícola Barbarense Futebol Clube players
Macaé Esporte Futebol Clube players
Casimiro de Abreu Esporte Clube players
Shahzan Muda FC players
Expatriate footballers in Malaysia
River Atlético Clube players

Association football midfielders
People from Itaboraí